The 2006 World Series of Poker (WSOP) began on June 25, 2006 with satellite events, with regular play commencing on June 26 with the annual Casino Employee event, and the Tournament of Champions held on June 28 and 29. 40 more events in various disciplines including Omaha, seven-card stud and razz, plus ladies' and senior tournaments led up to the 10,000 US$ no-limit Texas hold 'em main event starting July 28 and running through the final table on August 10.

All events were held at the Rio All Suite Hotel and Casino in Las Vegas, Nevada, which marked the first time that a casino other than Binion's Horseshoe (now "Binion's") hosted the final table of the main event. 6 days reserved for the first 2 rounds of play for the main event were established by Harrah's Entertainment, which has run the annual event since its purchase from the Binion family in 2004.

The first prize in the main event was $12 million (US$), at that time the richest prize for the winner of any sports or television event in history. The top 12 players became millionaires. The record prize was surpassed at the 2012 WSOP, when the winner of the $1 million buy-in Big One for One Drop, Antonio Esfandiari, received a first-place prize $18.3 million.

The 2006 World Series featured a much-anticipated HORSE tournament with a $50,000 buy-in, the highest ever for a single WSOP event.

Humberto Brenes, Phil Hellmuth, Chris Ferguson, and Alex Jacob tied for the most cashes during the WSOP, with 8 cashes each. Jeff Madsen, who won 2 events and made 2 other final tables (finishing 3rd both times), was named the 2006 WSOP Player of the Year (POTY). He barely edged Hellmuth, who also made 4 final tables.

Events

Main Event
The 2006 Main Event (event #39) remains the largest tournament in poker history by prize pool with a total prize pool of $82,512,162. The tournament, like every WSOP Main Event, is a $10,000 No-Limit Texas Hold'em event. Due to the 8,773-player field, there were four separate starting days (1A-1D), each playing down to 800 people. They were later combined into one other set of separate days (2A and 2B) before becoming one whole group. The field was whittled down to 9 players on August 8, and Jamie Gold was crowned World Champion on August 10. The final table of the "Main Event" was offered live on Pay-Per-View, but unlike ESPN telecasts, viewers at home could not see the hole cards of the players unless the player turned their cards over.

Along with the usual $10,000 chip stacks, a new feature to the WSOP was the "All-In" button. Tournament directors have informed the participants that the coin could be used in lieu of pushing all of one’s chips into the pot.

The beige $50,000 chips that were used in 2005 were not used in 2006. Instead, tangerine and yellow $25,000 chips, in the design of the current $25 chips, were used. And for the first time in World Series of Poker History, a $100,000 chip was introduced on day 7. The chips were mint green with black edge spots in the design of the current yellow/black $1,000 chip.

Final table

*Career statistics prior to the beginning of the 2006 Main Event.

Final table results

Other high finishes
NB: This list is restricted to top 30 finishers with an existing Wikipedia entry.

Performance of past World Champions
 Day 1: Dan Harrington, Phil Hellmuth Jr., Doyle Brunson, Bobby Baldwin, Chris Moneymaker, Johnny Chan, "Amarillo Slim" Preston
 Day 2: Berry Johnston, Scotty Nguyen, Huck Seed, Greg Raymer, Robert Varkonyi
 Day 3: Carlos Mortensen , Chris Ferguson,
 Day 4: Tom McEvoy, Joe Hachem

Trivia
 Celebrity players featured in the Main Event included Hank Azaria, Paul Azinger, Charles Barkley, Richard Brodie, Dean Cain, Tony Cascarino, Denny Crum, Steve Davis, Shannon Elizabeth, Salvatore (Sully) Erna, James Garner, Brad Garrett, Michael Greco, Ron Jeremy, Joanna Krupa, Lennox Lewis, Matthew Lillard, Norm Macdonald, Tobey Maguire, Mekhi Phifer, Laura Prepon, Antonio Tarver, Wil Wheaton, and Jimmy White. Both Davis and Erna finished in the money, coming in 579th and 713th places respectively.

Controversy

Event 5 
When play resumed during day 2 of this event, a table with players, Daniel Negreanu, Gavin Smith, and Kathy Liebert were given extra chips after tournament officials had misplaced Mirza Nagji's chips in the wrong seat. Unknowingly, the rest of the players assumed that this stack was someone else's who was late and blinded off the stack. Eventually a player noticed that the stack was Mirza Nagji's chips, who by that time had been given replacement chips. Players estimate that out of the extra 120,000 in chips that were put into play, around 10,000–11,000 in chips had already been blinded off from the empty stack.

Event 20 
Many poker players who entered into the HORSE event discovered that the cards they were playing with were marked or easily markable. Andy Bloch was assessed a 10‑minute penalty for crumpling a card when a dealer refused to replace the deck after the new deck that came in was rife with markings. When asked for comment, WSOP Commissioner Jeffrey Pollack said, "I hadn't heard anything about the cards being marked until today. I am looking into getting more fresh setups and I am definitely working on solving the problem."

Event 25 
During Event 25, the $2,000 NL Hold 'em Shootout, the structure was changed mid-tournament from a full table into a 6-handed table event. Harry Demetriou, who had been playing in the event, objected to the change in format citing that a shootout should be 9, 10 or 11 handed, yelling about the unfair change in structure. Harry was eventually ejected from the tournament and was later refunded his money. Daniel Negreanu missed the event completely because he assumed that the event would be a full table and he would be able to come into the tournament a little bit later after sleeping in. However, by the time he showed up David Singer had won his table after blinding off Negreanu's stack.

See also
 2006 World Series of Poker Results
 World Series of Poker circuit events
 World Series of Poker Tournament of Champions

References

External links
 Official site

World Series of Poker
World Series of Poker
2006 in poker